The Last Debate is a 2000 American political drama television film directed by John Badham and written by Jon Maas, based on the 1995 book by Jim Lehrer, and starring James Garner and Peter Gallagher. It aired on Showtime on November 5, 2000.

Synopsis
A televised presidential debate has a conspiracy behind it.

Cast

 James Garner as Mike Howley
 Peter Gallagher as Tom Chapman
 Audra McDonald as Barbara Manning
 Donna Murphy as Joan Naylor
 Marco Sanchez as Henry Ramirez
 Dorian Harewood as Brad Lily
  Michael Riley as Jack Turpin
 Bruce Gray as Governor Paul L. Greene
 Stephen Young as Richard Meredith
 Lawrence Dane as Sidney Robert Mulvane
 Djanet Sears as Nancy Dewey
 Peter Donaldson as Jeff Grayson
 John Badham as Don Beard
 Leslie Carlson as Pat Tubbs
 Maggie Huculak as Gwyn Garrison
 Martin Doyle as Jim Weaver
 Brenda Robins as Carol Reynolds
 Colin Fox as Joshua L. Simpson
 Judah Katz as Bob Lucas
 Robin Ward as Mark Southeran
 Don Ritchie as Church Hammond
 Nicky Guadagni as Sam Minter
 Patrice Goodman as Roz Weisberg
 Barry Flatman as Ned Cannon
 Shelley Peterson as Joyce Meredith
 Annabelle Torsein as Alison Meredith
 Lynn Vogt as Ellen Greene
 Eamon Zekkon as TV Director
 Barbara Gordon as Lorraine Hampstead
 Nancy Harewood as Bonnie Kerr
 Ann Marin as Female Reporter
 Vanessa Vaughan as Grace Dickins
 Doug Murray as Jeff Field
 Martin Roach as Room Service Waiter
 Denis Akiyama as TV Makeup Artist
 Bryan Renfro as Steve Harrington
 Sharron Matthews as Barbara Fan
 Chuck Campbell as Bartender

Production
Filming took place in Toronto.

References

External links
 

2000 films
2000 drama films
2000s American films
2000s English-language films
2000s political drama films
American drama television films
American political drama films
Films about fictional presidents of the United States
Films about journalists
Films about presidential elections
Films based on American novels
Films directed by John Badham
Films scored by Arthur B. Rubinstein
Films shot in Toronto
Scott Free Productions films
Showtime (TV network) films
Television films based on books